James Dempsey (born 1989) is an Irish hurler who plays as a goalkeeper for the Offaly senior team.

Born in Kinnitty, County Offaly, Dempsey first arrived on the inter-county scene at the age of nineteen when he first linked up with the Offaly under-21 team. He made his senior debut during the 2010 league. Dempsey has since become a regular member of the starting 15.

At club level Dempsey plays with Kinnitty.

References

1989 births
Living people
Kinnitty hurlers
Offaly inter-county hurlers
Hurling goalkeepers